Josef Schümmelfelder (31 October 1891 – 12 February 1966) was a German international footballer.

References

1891 births
1966 deaths
Association football midfielders
German footballers
Germany international footballers